The New Year Sprint (formerly the Powderhall Sprint) is the name of a handicap sprint race for professional athletes that takes place each year in Scotland. The sprint is one of the original events of this type, tracing its history back to 1870.

Origins 

The race was originally called the Powderhall Sprint after the district of Edinburgh where it first took place.
The Powderhall Sprint was one of a circuit of professional handicap sprint races that prospered in the late nineteenth century in the United Kingdom. The handicap system meant the highly rated runners ran longer distance than the less highly rated runners - the handicap being determined by previous results. Those runners that had to run the full distance, the most highly rated, were running from 'scratch'. A huge amount of betting surrounded all the professional races and they were often shrouded in allegations of fraud to ensure a winner favourable to the bookmakers.

The race later moved from Powderhall to the Meadowbank Stadium in Edinburgh and then onto Musselburgh Racecourse. The move, in 1971, to the Meadowbank Stadium happened after the newly opened venue had hosted the 1970 Commonwealth Games. The Powderhall Stadium had hosted the Powderhall Sprint uninterrupted, including through two world wars, since 1870, apart from a brief break in 1953 and between 1958 and 1964 when various venues in Scotland hosted the race. In 1999, the race moved to Musselburgh Racecourse.

Present Race 

The present race is run at Musselburgh Racecourse and is now run over 110 meters, with the winner receiving GBP£4,000.

In 1993, amateur athletes were allowed to compete for the first time without the risk of losing their amateur status.

The race was moved to mid-January 2021.

Famous Competitors 

The New Year Sprint in its various incarnations has attracted many of the world's top sprinters.

During the First World War, it attracted the great Australian sprinter Jack Donaldson and British Olympic medal winner Willie Applegarth.

Willie McFarlane won the race 2 years in succession in 1933 and 1934, the latter from scratch- a record that still stands.
in 1951, Geoff Harrington from Brownhills won the race, beating Eric Cumming, and beating the 150-year-old record with a time of 11.5 seconds
In 1952, the great Australian sprinter Eric Cumming was champion and the American Olympian Barney Ewell was a competitor.

In 1970, the winner was George McNeill who is the holder of the world professional 120 yards record.

In 1987, the former United States collegiate 200 m champion William Snoddy won.

See also 
Stawell Gift A similar race run in Australia.
Polar bear plunge New Year's swimming tradition

References 

Athletics competitions in Scotland
Recurring sporting events established in 1870
New Year celebrations
Sprint (running)
Annual sporting events in the United Kingdom
Sport in East Lothian
1870 establishments in Scotland